Gregg Township may refer to the following townships in the United States:

 Gregg Township, Morgan County, Indiana
 Gregg Township, Centre County, Pennsylvania
 Gregg Township, Union County, Pennsylvania